La Michilía Biosphere Reserve is a protected area in northwestern Mexico. It is located in the Sierra Madre Occidental range in southern Durango state.

Geography
The reserve covers an area of 350 km2. The reserve spans two ranges, the Sierra Michis and the Sierra Urica, which are part of the Sierra Madre Occidental. Between the two sierras is a landscape of hills and plateaus, threaded through by valleys and canyons. The valley of the San Pedro Mezquital River lies west of the reserve, and the Mexican Plateau to the north and east. The reserve adjoins the Cuenca Alimentadora del Distrito Nacional de Riego 043 Estado de Nayarit on the northwest and southwest.

Ecology
There reserve is in the Sierra Madre Occidental pine–oak forests ecoregion. It is home to several  distinct plant communities. Conifer forests prevail at higher elevation, with species of pine (Pinus), Mexican Douglas-fir (Pseudotsuga menziesii var. lindleyana), cypress (Cupressus), and juniper (Juniperus), along with pine–oak forests. Oak (Quercus spp.) forests and woodlands are found at middle elevations. Other plant communities include grasslands, dry shrubland, and wetlands. The reserve is home to 770 species of vascular plants.

Large mammals include the white-tailed deer (Odocoileus virginianus mexicanus), puma (Puma concolor), and coyote (Canis latrans). The Mexican gray wolf (Canis lupus baileyii) and American black bear (Ursus americanus) had been extirpated from the reserve, but have been successfully reintroduced.

Native birds include the golden eagle (Aquila chrysaetos), wild turkey (Meleagris gallopavo), and thick-billed parrot (Rhynchopsitta pachyrhyncha). The imperial woodpecker (Campephilus imperialis) once inhabited the area but is now thought to be extinct.

Conservation
It was designated an international biosphere reserve by UNESCO in 1977, and designated a Mexican national biosphere reserve in 2000.

References

Biosphere reserves of Mexico
Protected areas of Durango
Protected areas of the Sierra Madre Occidental
Important Bird Areas of Mexico